Avenger class may refer to:
 , a class of four World War II ships: three British, one American
 , a class of American ships in the 1980s and 1990s

See also
 for American warships with the name
 for British warships with the name